The Muscowpetung Saulteaux Nation (In Syllabics, written as ᒪᐢᑯᐘᐲᑕᐣᐠ) is a Saulteaux band government in southern Saskatchewan, Canada. Their reserves include:
 Last Mountain Lake 80A, shared with 6 other bands
 Muscowpetung 80
 Treaty Four Reserve Grounds 77, shared with 32 other bands.

History 
1874–1909: The Queen's representatives set apart reserve land and entered into Treaty 4, also known as the Qu'Appelle Treaty on September 15, 1874 at Fort Qu'Appelle, Saskatchewan, with the Muscowpetung Saulteaux band. In exchange for payments, provisions and rights to reserve lands, Treaty 4 ceded Indigenous territory to the federal government.

1909: On January 4, 1909, band members and elders were summoned at noon by an Indian Agent who claimed he was representing the Crown. At 11:00 pm those in attendance gave in to pressure and accepted cash payments offered by the agent in exchange for 17,600 acres of prime agricultural land amounting to almost 47% of the original reserve area. There were several documented cases of Indian Agents purchasing surrendered land despite the Indian Act prohibiting such purchases.

References

First Nations in Saskatchewan